Yellow Army may refer to:

 Canvey Island F.C.
 Central Coast Mariners FC
 NAC Breda
 Norwich City F.C.
Oxford United F.C.
 Watford F.C.
Manjappada Kerala Blasters Fans
Chennai Super Kings
ASM Clermont Auvergne
Torquay United F.C